The 2009 Kor Royal Cup was the 76th Kor Royal Cup, an annual football match contested by the winners and runners-up of the previous season's Thailand Premier League competitions. The match was contested at Suphachalasai Stadium, Bangkok, on 1 March 2009, and contested by 2008 Thailand Premier League champions PEA, and Chonburi as the runners-up of the 2008 Thailand Premier League. The game ended in a 1–0 winning for Chonburi – the goal coming from Suree Sukha.

Match details

See also
2008 Thailand Premier League

Kor
2009